Thierry Hancisse (born 20 November 1962, in Liège) is a Belgian actor. His acting credits include Un soir au club, The Boat Race, Le Couperet, Gabrielle, The Colonel, The Night Watchman, The Lady in the Car with Glasses and a Gun and Fool Moon. He was nominated for the Magritte Award for Best Actor for The Boat Race.

References

External links

1962 births
Living people
Belgian male film actors
Belgian male stage actors
Belgian male voice actors
21st-century Belgian male actors
Cours Florent alumni
Belgian male television actors
20th-century Belgian male actors
Actors from Liège